MAGUK p55 subfamily member 5 is a protein that in humans is encoded by the MPP5 gene.
Members of the peripheral membrane-associated guanylate kinase (MAGUK) family function in tumor suppression and receptor clustering by forming multiprotein complexes containing distinct sets of transmembrane, cytoskeletal, and cytoplasmic signaling proteins. All MAGUKs contain a PDZ-SH3-GUK core and are divided into 4 subfamilies, DLG-like (see DLG1; MIM 601014), ZO1-like (see TJP1; MIM 601009), p55-like (see MPP1; MIM 305360), and LIN2-like (see CASK; MIM 300172), based on their size and the presence of additional domains (Tseng et al., 2001). MPP5 is a member of the p55-like MAGUK subfamily.[supplied by OMIM]

Interactions
MPP5 has been shown to interact with INADL and FAM71D.

References

Further reading